Li Xueying (born May 15, 1990 in Henan) is a Chinese weightlifter.

See also 
China at the 2012 Summer Olympics

References

1990 births
Living people
Asian Games medalists in weightlifting
Chinese female weightlifters
Olympic gold medalists for China
World Weightlifting Championships medalists
Olympic weightlifters of China
Weightlifters from Henan
Weightlifters at the 2012 Summer Olympics
Olympic medalists in weightlifting
People from Zhengzhou
Weightlifters at the 2010 Asian Games
Medalists at the 2012 Summer Olympics
Asian Games gold medalists for China
Medalists at the 2010 Asian Games
21st-century Chinese women